German submarine U-982 was a Type VIIC U-boat of Nazi Germany's Kriegsmarine during World War II.

She was ordered on 5 June 1941, and was laid down on 24 August 1942 at Blohm & Voss, Hamburg, as yard number 182. She was launched on 29 April 1943 and commissioned under the command of Oberleutnant zur See Edmund Grochowiak on 10 June 1943.

Design
German Type VIIC submarines were preceded by the shorter Type VIIB submarines. U-982 had a displacement of  when at the surface and  while submerged. She had two shafts and two  propellers.

U-982 was fitted with five  torpedo tubes (four fitted at the bow and one at the stern), fourteen torpedoes or 26 TMA mines, one  SK C/35 naval gun, 220 rounds, and one twin  C/30 anti-aircraft gun. The boat had a complement of between 44 — 52 men.

Service history
U-982 sailed on only one short war patrol, lasting 19 days. She neither attacked nor sank any ships.

On 9 April 1945, U-982 was destroyed by bombs in the No. 5 box of the U-boat bunker Fink II at Hamburg-Finkenwerder. U-982 was caught in a British RAF Bomber Command raid. There were no casualties and the wreck was later broken up.

References

External links

Bibliography

German Type VIIC submarines
U-boats commissioned in 1943
World War II submarines of Germany
Ships built in Hamburg
1943 ships
Maritime incidents in April 1945